K.J.V. Steenstrup Glacier is one of the major glaciers in King Christian IX Land, by the eastern coast of Greenland, Sermersooq municipality. 
This ice formation includes two nearly parallel glaciers, the Northern K.J.V. Steenstrup Glacier and the Southern K.J.V. Steenstrup Glacier. These glaciers were named after Danish geologist and explorer of Greenland K. J. V. Steenstrup (1842 - 1913).

Geography
The K.J.V. Steenstrup Glaciers originate in a mountainous glaciated area east of Schweizerland. They flow from the NW in a roughly southeastern direction.

The two glaciers have their terminus on the east coast of the Greenland ice sheet, in the Denmark Strait roughly 8 km west of Tasiilap Karra (Cape Gustav Holm). The northern side of the terminus of the Northern K.J.V. Steenstrup Glacier is by the mouth of the Ikersuaq (Ikertivaq) fjord. Their faces form impressive walls of ice between 60 and 90 m high.

See also
List of glaciers in Greenland

References

External links
Photo of View Down KJV Steenstrup Norde Brae Glacier
Department of Geodesy, DTU Space - GNET GPS Station KJV Steenstrup Nordre Bræ
Kjv Steenstrups Sondre Brae Map
Glaciers of Greenland